Florida's 5th congressional district is a congressional district in the U.S. state of Florida. It includes portions of Jacksonville and its suburbs east of the St. Johns River and stretches to St. Augustine in St. Johns County.

From 2002 to 2013 the district comprised all of Citrus, Hernando, and Sumter counties and most of Lake, Levy, and Pasco counties and portions of Marion and Polk counties. The district included northern exurbs of Tampa and western exurbs of Orlando within the high-growth Interstate 4 Corridor. This iteration of the 5th district is now largely contained in the 11th district.

As defined by the state legislature in 2013 (which lasted until 2017), the 5th district ran from Jacksonville to Orlando; it was considered one of the most-gerrymandered congressional districts in the country. Before 2013, similar territory was included in the 3rd district.

After court-mandated redistricting, the district became a majority-minority district from 2017 to 2023. It extended along Florida's northern boundary from Jacksonville to Tallahassee and included all of Baker, Gadsden, Hamilton and Madison counties and portions of Columbia, Duval, Jefferson, and Leon counties.

The district is currently represented by Republican John Rutherford.

Historical district boundaries
Florida's 3rd Congressional District was renumbered to 5th Congressional District but was little changed in the redistricting process in 2012, still winding from Orlando in the south to central Jacksonville in the north.

From 1973 to 1993 the erstwhile 3rd district was based in Orange County, including Walt Disney World and most of Orlando. The peculiar shape of the 3rd (now 5th) Congressional District dates from reapportionment done by the Florida Legislature after the 1990 U.S. Census. The 1993–2012 3rd Congressional District was geographically distinctive. Starting from the southern part of the district, it included the Pine Hills area of the Orlando-Kissimmee Metropolitan Area with small pockets of African-American neighborhoods in the cities of Sanford, Gainesville, Palatka, and finally the larger African American communities of Jacksonville. Connecting these areas were regions which are sparsely populated—either expansive rural areas or narrow strips which are only a few miles wide. Barack Obama received 73% of the vote in this district in the 2008 Presidential election.

Court-ordered changes
On July 11, 2014, Florida Circuit Court Judge Terry Lewis ruled that this district, along with the neighboring District 10, had been drawn to favor the Republican Party by packing black Democratic voters into District 5. On August 1, Judge Lewis gave Florida's state legislature an Aug. 15 deadline to submit new congressional maps for those two districts.

5th District Representative Corrine Brown issued a statement blasting Lewis's decision on the district map as "seriously flawed," and Congressional Black Caucus Chairwoman Marcia Fudge sent a sharply worded letter to Democratic Congressional Campaign Committee Chairman Steve Israel complaining about the party’s support for the lawsuit challenging Florida's district maps.

Brown said that "we will go all the way to the United States Supreme Court, dealing with making sure that African Americans are not disenfranchised." Florida House Redistricting Chairman Richard Corcoran, a Republican, said that "consideration of political data is legally required" to ensure that district boundaries would not be so shifted as to not allow African-Americans a chance to elect representatives of their choice.

On appeal, the Florida Supreme Court approved a redrawn version of District 5 on December 2, 2015. That plan went into effect for the 2016 elections. The new district had a dramatically different shape than its predecessor. It now stretched in an east-west configuration along the Georgia border from downtown Jacksonville to Tallahassee. However, it was no less Democratic than its predecessor, as noted in the Florida Supreme Court's final opinion:

Voting

List of members representing the district 

The district was created January 3, 1937.

Election results

2002

2004

2006

2008

2010

2012

2014

2016

2018

2020

References 

 
 
 Congressional Biographical Directory of the United States 1774–present

05
1937 establishments in Florida